Mlakar is a Slovene surname. It is the 8th most common surname in Slovenia. It is equally present throughout the country, and it is especially common in Lower Styria, in Inner Carniola and parts of the Slovenian Littoral.

It may refer to:

Iztok Mlakar (born 1961), Slovenian singer-songwriter, chansonnier and theatre actor
Matjaž Mlakar (born 1981), professional handball player currently playing for RK Gorenje
Oliver Mlakar (born 1935), Croatian television presenter, best known for hosting game shows
Pino Mlakar (1907–2006), Slovenian ballet dancer, choreographer, and teacher
Roy Mlakar (born 1950), president and CEO of the Ottawa Senators professional ice hockey club

See also
Stanko Mlakar Stadium, multi-purpose stadium in Kranj, Slovenia

References

Slovene-language surnames